The Sierra de Híjar is a mountain range of the Cantabrian Mountains System, located in the Province of Palencia and the Autonomous Community of Cantabria in northern Spain.

Geography
The highest peaks in the range are concentrated in the  northeastern to central section. From there the altitude declines.

The range's highest point is at the peak of Cuchillón, although its exact altitude differs by source, including:  according to the National Geographic Institute of Spain (Instituto Geográfico Nacional); and  according to Francisco Hernández-Pacheco and in other publications by the same National Geographic Institute. 

This system marks the boundary between the regions of Campoo in Cantabria and La Pernia in Palencia of Castile and León.

Main peaks
The highest points are concentrated in the central sector, including Tres Mares and Cueto Manin. The northwestern sector contains the long spine of Peña Labra and an access point to the summit from Polaciones. The southeastern sector, extending from Sestil to Alto de Hoyos, is the lowest and is called the Cinto Brotherhood.

Toponymy
According to cartographic studies by the National Geographic Institute of Spain and other works, the name "Peña Labra" is often used to refer to this system, especially as seen from the south side. From this perspective, the top of Peña Labra appears most prominently, though it is not the highest in the system. However, all previously existing mapping, including the first series of the National Geographic Institute, or those of Francisco Coello and Quesada and Pascual Madoz, refers to this mountain as "Sierra de Híjar."

References

Hijar
Mountain ranges of Cantabria 
Geography of the Province of Palencia